is a Japanese adult video (AV) director.  He has directed more than 200 videos during his long career.

Life and career
In 1989, Hasegawa was still making videos for V&R Planning but was also working for another early AV studio VIP. By March 1991, Hasegawa was directing for Alice Japan with the video . Hasegawa would spend much of his AV career with Alice Japan, directing more than 100 videos for the studio.

When the new AV studio Max-A started up in May 1992, Hasegawa directed the first video on their Samansa label, starring AV Idol Hitomi Shiraishi. Throughout the 1990s, Hasegawa continued to direct for Alice Japan, VIP and Max-A as well as Shy Plan, Media Station, and VIP's successor Atlas21.

Also in 2006, Hasegawa directed the historical costume drama set in the Edo period, The Inner Palace: Indecent War, released by Max-A under the DoraMax label in July 2006. In addition to the hardcore video the movie was also released in a shorter softcore R-15 rated version. A sequel The Inner Palace: Flower of War (also directed by Hasegawa) was once again released in both hardcore and softcore versions. The two videos were released in a combined four-hour digitally remastered edition in May 2009.

During his long career in the adult video industry, Hasegawa worked with many actresses including early AV Idols Keiko Nakazawa, Hitomi Shiraishi and Rui Sakuragi, as well as later stars Sora Aoi, Yuma Asami, Bunko Kanazawa, Nao Oikawa, Riko Tachibana, Rio, Maria Yumeno and others.

Aside from reissues of earlier AV works, all his recent activity seems to be in the V-Cinema sphere.

References

External links
 
 

Japanese film directors
Japanese pornographic film directors
Living people
Year of birth missing (living people)